Yevgeny Ivanovich Lyadin (April 9, 1926 – April 3, 2011) was a Russian football manager and former player.

Lyadin was the first foreign professional football manager to coach a club in the Iranian Football League (Azadegan League) after the Iranian Revolution. In 1994 while coaching F.C. Zob Ahan a club based in Isfahan, Iran, he invited his fellow countryman Sergey Ponomarev to come and play for his team.

Lyadin was the coach of Soviet youth national teams in 1965–1972 and 1979–1982. His teams won the UEFA European Under-19 Football Championship in 1966 and 1967.

References
IranLeague
Lokomotiv Alley of Fame 

1926 births
2011 deaths
Soviet football managers
Russian football managers
Expatriate football managers in Iran
Soviet footballers
FC Lokomotiv Moscow players
Zob Ahan Esfahan F.C. managers
Russian expatriate football managers
Association football midfielders